Rhizocephala are derived barnacles that parasitise mostly decapod crustaceans, but can also infest Peracarida, mantis shrimps and thoracican barnacles, and are found from the deep ocean to freshwater. Together with their sister groups Thoracica and Acrothoracica, they make up the subclass Cirripedia. Their body plan is uniquely reduced in an extreme adaptation to their parasitic lifestyle, and makes their relationship to other barnacles unrecognisable in the adult form.

Description and lifecycle

As adults they lack appendages, segmentation, and all internal organs except gonads, a few muscles, and the remains of the nervous system. Females also have a cuticle, which is never shed. Other than the minute larval stages, there is nothing identifying them as crustaceans or even arthropods in general. The only distinguishable portion of a rhizocephalan body is the externa; the reproductive portion of adult females.

Nauplii released from adult females swim in water for several days without taking food (the larva has no mouth and no intestine) and transform into cypris larvae (cyprids) after several moults. Like the nauplii, the cyprids are lecithotrophic (non-feeding). The female cypris in Kentrogonida settles on a host and metamorphoses into a specialized juvenile form called a kentrogon, which has no visible segmentation and has no appendages except the antennules that are used to attach itself to the host, and whose only purpose is to inject a cell mass named the vermigon into the host's hemolymph through a retractive hollow stylet on its head. The kentrogon stage seems to have been lost in all of the Akentrogonida, where the cypris injects the vermigon through one of its antennules. The vermigon grows into root-like threads through the host's tissue, centering on the digestive system and especially the hepatopancreas, and absorb nutrients from the hemolymph. This network of threads is called the interna. The female then grows a sac-like externa, which consists of a mantle, a mantle cavity, an ovary and a pair of passageways known as cell receptacles, extruding from the abdomen of the host.

In the order Kentrogonida, the virgin externa contains no openings at first. But it soon molts to a second stage that contains an orifice known as the mantle departure, and which leads into the two receptacle passageways — once assumed to be the testes in hermaphroditic parasites before the realization that they were actually two separate sexes — and starts releasing pheromones to attract male cyprids. From inside the body of the male cypris that succeeds in entering the departure, a unique and very short lived male stage called the trichogen emerges through the antennule opening. It is the homologue of the female kentrogon, but is reduced to an amoeboid unsegmented cuticle-covered mass of cells consisting of three to four cell-types: the dorsolateral, the ventral epidermis, the inclusion cells, and the postganglion. The externa have room for two males, one for each of the receptacles, which increase the heterozygosity of the offspring. Once inside, the trichogen will shed its cuticle before reaching the end of the passageway.

In the order Akentrogonida, which form a monophyletic group nested within the paraphyletic Kentrogonida, the male does not develop into a trichogon, and the cypris injects its cell mass through its antennule and directly into the body of the immature externa. The offspring also hatch directly into fully developed cyprids instead of nauplius larvae (except for a few species of kentrogonid rhizocephalans, which hatch into cyprids like the akentrogonids, the kentrogonids have kept their nauplius stage). In species like Clistosaccus paguri, the male injects its cluster of cells which migrates through the connective tissue of the mantle and into the receptacle. But in forms like Sylon hippolytes the receptacle is absent, and the males cells implant in the ovary instead. While only a single male can settle in each receptacle, which is the rule in Kentrogonida, the number of implanted males in Akentrogonida can range from just one to more than ten.

The small cluster of cells injected by the male cypris will, once it reaches its destination inside the female, differentiate into a loosely connected mass of sperm-producing germ cells. Being nothing more than sperm-forming cells, these adult male rhizocephalans represent the simplest form of male in the entire animal kingdom. Mature female externa releases eggs into its mantle cavity where eggs are fertilised by sperm from the hyper-parasitic male(s). Due to the larval sexual dimorphism in the Kentrogonida, the females produce two different egg sizes; small female eggs and larger male eggs. It appears the sex determination in Akentrogonida is environmental.

In Peltogasterella gracilis, the externa produces several batches of larvae before it drops off the host, taking the male(s) inside with it. After the original externa disappear, the host moults and the interna grows buds that each develops into a new virgin externa. The females commonly has two cypris cell receptacles. With more than one externa, and new ones replacing the old ones, each female Peltogasterella can receive sperm from numerous males during its lifetime.

The externa is where the host's egg sac would be, and the host's behaviour is chemically altered: it is castrated and does not moult until aged externa(e) drop(s) off. The host treats the externa as if it were its own egg sac. This behaviour even extends to male hosts, which would never have carried eggs, but care for the externa in the same way as females.

Classification
Following an updated classification of barnacles by Chan et al. (2021), the subgroups Akentrogonida and Kentrogonida were not retained, leaving 13 families as children of the infraclass Rhizocephala.

 Family Chthamalophilidae Bocquet-Védrine, 1961
 Family Clistosaccidae Boschma, 1928
 Family Duplorbidae Høeg & Rybakov, 1992
 Family Mycetomorphidae Høeg & Rybakov, 1992
 Family Parthenopeidae Rybakov & Høeg, 2013
 Family Peltogasterellidae Høeg & Glenner, 2019
 Family Peltogastridae Lilljeborg, 1861
 Family Pirusaccidae Høeg & Glenner, 2019
 Family Polyascidae Høeg & Glenner, 2019
 Family Polysaccidae Lützen & Takahashi, 1996
 Family Sacculinidae Lilljeborg, 1861
 Family Thompsoniidae Høeg & Rybakov, 1992
 Family Triangulidae Høeg & Glenner, 2019

Phylogeny
The following cladogram summarizes the internal relationships of Rhizocephala as of 2020, as well as the number of species in each family.

See also
 List of Cirripedia genera

References

External links

Barnacles
Taxa named by Fritz Müller
Parasitic crustaceans
Parasites of crustaceans